Gratia may refer to:

 Gratia (goddess), a goddess in Greek mythology
 Gratia, Teleorman, a commune in Romania
 Gratia (Paul McCartney song)
 Gratia (mayfly), a genus of small minnow mayflies
 424 Gratia, a large main belt asteroid
 HTC Gratia, a model of smartphones
 USS Gratia (AKS-11), a 1944 Acubens-class general stores issue ship

People with the name 
 Charles Louis Gratia (1815–1911), French painter and pastel artist
 Gratia Countryman (1866–1953), American librarian
 Gratia Schimmelpenninck van der Oye (1912–2012), former Dutch alpine skier

See also
 
 
 Ex gratia ("From kindness"), in law
 Sola gratia, one of the Five solae during the Protestant Reformation
 Dei Gratia (disambiguation)

Feminine given names